Nallely Vela Rascón (born February 8, 1986 in Veracruz, Veracruz) is a Mexican sprinter, who specialized in the 400 metres. She won a total of three medals (two golds and one silver), as a member of the Mexican relay team, at the Ibero-American Championships (2006 in Ponce, Puerto Rico, 2008 in Iquique, Chile, and 2010 in San Fernando, Cádiz, Spain).

Vela competed for the women's 4 × 400 m relay at the 2008 Summer Olympics in Beijing, along with her teammates Zudikey Rodríguez, Gabriela Medina, and Ruth Grajeda. Running the third leg, Vela recorded her individual-split time of 53.01 seconds, and the Mexican team went on to finish the second heat in seventh place, for a total time of 3:30.36.

References

External links

NBC 2008 Olympics profile

Mexican female sprinters
Living people
Olympic athletes of Mexico
Sportspeople from Veracruz
Athletes (track and field) at the 2008 Summer Olympics
People from Veracruz (city)
1986 births
Central American and Caribbean Games medalists in athletics
Olympic female sprinters